Heitai is a town in southeastern Heilongjiang province, China. Nearby are Jixi City,  to the west-southwest, and Khanka Lake,  to the southeast.

There are 11 villages in the town.

References
2009年密山市行政区划 (Simplified Chinese)

Township-level divisions of Heilongjiang